Elizabeth Gertrude Bunter, better known as Bessie Bunter, is a fictional character created by Charles Hamilton, who also created her more famous brother Billy Bunter.

History

Billy Bunter was a central character in the Greyfriars School stories which appeared in the boys' story paper The Magnet from 1907 to 1940, and Bessie's first appearance was in a 1919 Greyfriars story. She was a pupil of Cliff House School, a girls' school near Greyfriars.

In 1919, attempting to replicate the success of The Magnet, Amalgamated Press decided to bring out a new magazine for girls called The School Friend (later continued as The Schoolgirl), which included stories about Cliff House originally by Hamilton, using the pen name "Hilda Richards," supposedly the sister of "Frank Richards." The stories were soon taken over by other authors, also using the name Hilda Richards. The most prolific of these substitute writers was John W. Wheway, who wrote well over 500 Cliff House stories between 1931 and 1940.

Hamilton wrote one more Cliff House story, in 1949, called "Bessie Bunter of Cliff House School", and published by Cassell.

The character also appeared in comic strip format in the School Friend comic book, which was published from 1950 to 1965; she later moved to June, and, when that title ended, moved to Tammy.

In addition, she featured as an adult character in The League of Extraordinary Gentlemen: Black Dossier where she married the former Greyfriars schoolboy Harry Wharton.

Character
Bessie Bunter was essentially a female counterpart to her brother Billy, sharing many characteristics with her brother, including her large size and large appetite. She was as unappealing as her brother Billy, being conceited, untruthful, gluttonous and obese, but she was rather more domineering than he was and would usually impose her will by nagging, or, in the case of her brothers, by administering hefty slaps to the head.

References

Sources

External links 
 Friardale Hamilton material
 Magnets
 Greyfriars Index Detailed listing of Hamilton material
 The Friars Club Enthusiasts’ Club
 Bunterzone Enthusiasts’ site
 Index of Boys Weeklies
Bessie Bunter and Cliff House School
Cliff House School

Series of books
Characters in British novels
Literary characters introduced in 1919
Comics characters introduced in 1939
Child characters in comics
Female characters in comics
Female characters in literature
Child characters in literature
British comic strips
British comics characters
British humour comics
Comedy literature characters
1939 comics debuts
Gag-a-day comics
Comics spin-offs
Comics about women
Comics set in the United Kingdom
School-themed comics